John Henry Okwanyo was a politician from Kenya. He served in the government and cabinet of Daniel arap Moi, Kenya's second president, for many years. During this time, he held the post of member of parliament for the Larger Migori constituency (1963 – 1992) and the portfolios of Minister of Energy.

Early life and education 
Hon. Okwanyo was born in South Nyanza in 1928 and received his early education at Nyamome Primary, Kisii High School between 1946 and 1950 before joining the Medical Training Centre (MTC), Nairobi, where he qualified as a radiographer in 1953.
His mother is Hellen Nyachieo who hails from Waswetta and Father Noah Biko a Jakatiga.

Political career 
Mr Okwanyo was first elected to Parliament in 1963 to represent Migori.
He was appointed an Assistant Minister for Foreign affairs in 1969 and then as Minister of Commerce & Industry in 1979 before moving to head the Ministry of Energy from 1980 to 1982.
Hon. John Okwanyo was a member of the Anti-communist league and he represented Kenya in the 12th conference held in Seoul, Korea.

References 
 
 Migori Constituency 
 List of Ministers of Kenya

External links
 http://www.kenyamycountry.com/web/minister-and-ministries
 https://www.dailynation.co.ke/dailynation/news/politics/would-raila-s-exit-also-mark-the-end-of-odingaism--440312
 https://issuu.com/lynchart-ong/docs/suna_west_cdf_strategic_plan

Members of the National Assembly (Kenya)
Government ministers of Kenya
People from Migori County
Luo people
1928 births
1994 deaths